This is a list of cricketers who represented London County Cricket Club when it was officially designated a first-class team from 1900 to 1904. The details are the player's usual name followed by his name as it would appear on modern match scorecards (usually his surname preceded by all initials). As London County was a short-lived venture, nearly all of its players represented other first-class teams and most of them are better known for their careers at other county sides.

A
 Ted Arnold : E. G. Arnold
 Alfred Atfield : A. J. Atfield

B

C
 Ian Campbell : I. M. Campbell
 Samuel Coe : S. Coe
 Henry Colegrave : H. M. Colegrave
 E. Cox : E. Cox (1900)
 Beaumont Cranfield : B. Cranfield

D
 William Davis : W. E. Davis 
 Leonidas de Montezuma : L. D. M. de Montezuma
 Charles de Trafford : C. E. de Trafford
 Ted Dillon : E. W. Dillon
 Johnny Douglas : J. W. H. T. Douglas
 Thomas Drew : T. M. Drew
 William Dyas : W. G. Dyas

F
 Frederick Fane : F. L. Fane
 Frank Field : E. F. Field
 Tom Fishwick : T. S. Fishwick
 Frederick Fleming : F. Fleming
 Edgar Ford : E. S. Ford
 Edward French : E. L. French
 William Frith : W. F. L. Frith
 C. B. Fry : C. B. Fry

G

H

J
 Lionel Jackson : L. Jackson
 Bangalore Jayaram : B. Jayaram
 Gilbert Jessop : G. L. Jessop
 Arthur Jones : A. O. Jones

K
 Herbert Keigwin : H. S. Keigwin
 Richard Kenward : R. Kenward
 Alexander Kermode : A. Kermode
 Albert Knight : A. E. Knight
 Johannes Kotze : J. J. Kotze

L
 Bob Lambert : R. J. H. Lambert
 Albert Lawton : A. E. Lawton
 Walter Lees : W. S. Lees
 Dick Lilley : A. F. A. Lilley
 Charlie Llewellyn : C. B. Llewellyn

M

N
 Thomas Nicholson : T. B. Nicholson
 Newman Norman : N. F. Norman

O
 Thomas Oates : T. W. Oates
 William Odell : W. W. Odell

P
 Howard Parkes : H. R. Parkes
 Percy Perrin : P. A. Perrin
 Arthur Pickering : A. Pickering
 Les Poidevin : L. O. S. Poidevin
 Carst Posthuma : C. J. Posthuma
 Rowland Powell-Williams : R. Powell-Williams
 Charles Prince : C. F. H. Prince

Q
 Willie Quaife : W. G. Quaife

R

S

T
 Louis Tancred : L. J. Tancred
 Theodore Tapp : T. A. Tapp 
 Christian Tindall : C. Tindall
 Sidney Tindall : S. M. Tindall
 James Todd : J. H. Todd
 Charlie Townsend : C. L. Townsend
 Albert Trott : A. E. Trott

V
 Joe Vine : J. Vine
 Richard Voss : R. Z. H. Voss

W
 Livingstone Walker : L. Walker
 Benjamin Wallach : B. Wallach
 Lionel Wells : L. S. Wells
 David Williams : D. P. Williams
 Cecil Wood : C. J. B. Wood
 Arthur Woodcock : A. Woodcock
 Harry Wrathall : H. Wrathall

References

London County

London sport-related lists